Witold is a masculine Polish given name. This name derives from the Lithuanian “Vytautas” composed of two elements: “vyti” (chase) plus “tauta” (the people), but It is also possible that it is a name of Germanic origin which means "ruling the forest". Notable people with the name include:

Witold, nom de guerre used by Jan Karski (1914-2000), Polish resistance-fighter soldier and professor 
Witold Baran (born 1939), Polish middle distance runner
Witold Gombrowicz (1904–1969), Polish novelist and dramatist
Witold Hurewicz (1904–1956), Polish mathematician
Witold Kiełtyka (1984-2007), Polish drummer, founder of death metal band Decapitated (band)
 Witold Kieżun (1922–2021) Polish economist, participant of the Warsaw Uprising
Witold Lutosławski (1913–1994), Polish composer
Witold Małcużyński (1914–1977), Polish pianist
Witold Pilecki (1901–1948), founder of the Secret Polish Army (Tajna Armia Polska) 
Witold Pruszkowski (1846–1896), Polish painter
Witold Rybczynski (born 1943), professor of Urbanism at the University of Pennsylvania
Witold Tomczak (born 1957), Polish Member of the European Parliament
Witold Wojtkiewicz (1879–1909), Polish painter

Polish masculine given names